The Cordobés Formation is an Early Devonian (Pragian to Emsian) geologic formation of the Durazno Group in the Paraná Basin in the Durazno Department of central Uruguay. The shallow marine shales preserve trilobite, bivalve, gastropod and brachiopod fossils.

Description 
The Cordobés Formation is characterized by reddish fine shale deposited in a shallow marine environment.

Fossil content 
The following fossils have been reported from the formation:
 Trilobites
 Acaste sp.
 Burmeisteria sp.
 Metacryphaeus sp.
 ?Calmonia sp.
 ?Paracalmonia sp.
 ?Pennaia sp.
 Lophophorata
 Tentaculites sp.
 Strophomenata
 Australostrophia sp.
 Notiochonetes sp.
 Schuchertella sp.
 Rhynchonellata
 Derbyina sp.
 Australospirifer sp.
 Australocoelia sp.
 Lingulata
 Orbiculoidea sp.
 "Lingula" sp.
 Styliolina sp.
 "Serpulites" sp.
 Bivalves
 Modiolus sp.
 Modiomorpha sp.
 Goniophora sp.
 Pleurodapis sp.
 Nuculites sp.
 "Nuculana" sp.
 Gastropods
 Encrinaster sp.
 Plectonotus sp.

See also 
 List of fossiliferous stratigraphic units in Uruguay

References

Bibliography 

   
 

Geologic formations of Uruguay
Devonian System of South America
Devonian Uruguay
Emsian Stage
Pragian Stage
Shale formations
Shallow marine deposits
Formations
Fossiliferous stratigraphic units of South America
Paleontology in Uruguay
Formations